Emiliya Kunova (born 14 February 1960) is a Bulgarian athlete. She competed in the women's pentathlon at the 1980 Summer Olympics.

References

1960 births
Living people
Athletes (track and field) at the 1980 Summer Olympics
Bulgarian pentathletes
Olympic athletes of Bulgaria
Sportspeople from Sofia